The Ward Hunt Ice Shelf is the largest ice shelf in the Arctic, located near Ward Hunt Island, on the north coast of Ellesmere Island, Nunavut, Canada. During the 20th century the Ellesmere Ice Shelf broke up into six separate shelves, the largest being Ward Hunt. In 2005 one of the other shelves, the  Ayles Ice Shelf, calved completely.

The Ellesmere ice shelf was documented by the British Arctic Expedition of 1875–76, in which Lieutenant Pelham Aldrich's party went from Cape Sheridan (82.47°N, 61.50°W) west to Cape Alert (82.27°N, 85.55°W), including the Ward Hunt Ice Shelf. Reports from Robert Peary's expedition in 1906 described a “broad glacial fringe” covering much of the coast of northwestern Ellesmere Island.

The Ward Hunt ice sheet began breaking up approximately 100 years ago, but was believed to have stabilized by the early 1980s.  However, in April 2000, satellite images revealed that a large crack in the ice had begun to form, and in 2003, it was announced that the ice sheet had split completely in two in 2002, releasing a huge pool of fresh water from the largest epishelf lake in the Northern Hemisphere, located in Disraeli Fjord.  In April 2008, it was discovered that the shelf was fractured into dozens of deep, multi-faceted cracks.  In late July 2008, it was announced that nearly  broke away from the shelf. In August 2010, another 50 km² (19 sq mi) calved off from the northeast quarter of the ice shelf.

The icebergs released by the breakup now pose a potential danger to shipping and offshore development in the region.  Loss of microbial ecosystems caused by the release of the freshwater may also have far-ranging ecological impacts.

The breakup of the Ward Hunt Ice Shelf is tied to steady and dramatic increases in the average temperature of the region over the past decades, correlated with global warming.

Al Gore mentions the Ward Hunt Ice Shelf in his 2007 documentary An Inconvenient Truth.

References

External links
 Ward Hunt Ice Shelf, Environment Canada
 [https://web.archive.org/web/20040123233449/http://earthobservatory.nasa.gov/Study/wardhunt/
 http://www.nasa.gov/missions/earth/f_iceshelf.html NASA.gov]
 http://www.commondreams.org/headlines03/0924-06.htm

Ellesmere Island
Ice shelves of Qikiqtaaluk Region